
Gmina Rybno is a rural gmina (administrative district) in Działdowo County, Warmian-Masurian Voivodeship, in northern Poland.

Villages
Gmina Rybno contains the villages and settlements of Dębień, Grabacz, Grądy, Gralewo Stacja, Gronowo, Groszki, Hartowiec, Jeglia, Kopaniarze, Kostkowo, Koszelewki, Koszelewy, Lesiak, Naguszewo, Nowa Wieś, Prusy, Rapaty, Rumian, Rybno, Szczupliny, Truszczyny, Tuczki, Wery and Żabiny.

Neighbouring gminas
Gmina Rybno is bordered by the gminas of Dąbrówno, Działdowo, Grodziczno, Lidzbark, Lubawa and Płośnica.

References

Polish official population figures 2006

Rybno
Gmina Rybno